Ingrid Pan (born 1930) is a former stage and film actress who was active in the German cinema in the 1950s in prominent supporting roles. She later worked frequently in radio.

She was married to the German actor and playwright Heinz-Günter Stamm.

Selected filmography
 The White Horse Inn (1952)
 Lady's Choice (1953)
 Marriage for One Night (1953)
 Hooray, It's a Boy! (1953)
 A Musical War of Love (1953)
 Ave Maria (1953)
 The Sun of St. Moritz (1954)
 The Double Husband (1955)
 The Inn on the Lahn (1955)
 If We All Were Angels (1956)
 Wir Wunderkinder (1958)
 Hula-Hopp, Conny (1959)

References

Bibliography
 Elena Agazzi & Erhard Schütz. Handbuch Nachkriegskultur: Literatur, Sachbuch und Film in Deutschland (1945–1962). Walter de Gruyter, 2013.

External links

1930 births
Living people
Actresses from Berlin
German film actresses
German stage actresses